Streptomyces anulatus is a bacterium species from the genus Streptomyces which has been isolated from soil. Streptomyces anulatus produces cactinomycin, endophenazine A, endophenazine B, tubermycin B, endophenazine C, epocarbazolin A, epocarbazolin B, dextranase, telomestatin and actinomycin C.

See also 
 List of Streptomyces species

References

Further reading

External links
Type strain of Streptomyces anulatus at BacDive – the Bacterial Diversity Metadatabase

anulatus
Bacteria described in 1953